Joe Wiegand (born April 15, 1965) is an impersonator who has portrayed U.S. President Theodore Roosevelt in all fifty U.S. states, after a career as a political consultant. Wiegand performed at the White House on October 27, 2008, as part of the celebration of the 150th anniversary of Roosevelt's birth. He also modeled for a new Theodore Roosevelt sculpture commissioned the American Museum of Natural History. Wiegand is also a member and contributor to Theodore Roosevelt Association.

References

Further reading

External links

 Official site

1965 births
Living people
American impressionists (entertainers)
American political consultants
American male writers
Male actors from Chicago
Theodore Roosevelt